Alphanso Cunningham (born 29 August 1980) is a Paralympian athlete from Jamaica competing mainly in category F53 throwing events.

Career history
Cunningham competed in the 2004 Summer Paralympics in the javelin and won gold in the F53 discus throw.
 He competed in the 2008 Beijing Paralympics without winning a medal.

He won gold in the F52/53 javelin at the London 2012 Paralympics.

At the 2015 Parapan American Games in Toronto, Cunningham won gold in discus throw F51/52/53/57 and bronze in javelin throw F53/54/55 competition.

Cunningham finished 5th in javelin F54 and 10th in shot put F53 at the 2016 Summer Paralympics.

References

External links
 

1980 births
Living people
Paralympic athletes of Jamaica
Athletes (track and field) at the 2008 Summer Paralympics
Jamaican male discus throwers
Jamaican male javelin throwers
Athletes (track and field) at the 2004 Summer Paralympics
Athletes (track and field) at the 2012 Summer Paralympics
Paralympic gold medalists for Jamaica
World record holders in Paralympic athletics
Place of birth missing (living people)
Medalists at the 2004 Summer Paralympics
Medalists at the 2012 Summer Paralympics
Wheelchair category Paralympic competitors
Sportsmen with disabilities
Paralympic medalists in athletics (track and field)
Medalists at the 2007 Parapan American Games
Medalists at the 2011 Parapan American Games
Medalists at the 2015 Parapan American Games